Cape Egmont Lighthouse is a lighthouse at Cape Egmont in the Taranaki Region of the North Island of New Zealand. It is owned and operated by Maritime New Zealand.  The light was manufactured by Simpson & Co., Pimlico, London, in 1864 and erected on Mana Island to the north west of Porirua in 1865, but it was sometimes confused with the Pencarrow Head light at the entrance to Wellington Harbour and in 1877 the light was dismantled and moved to Cape Egmont.

The light was demanned and fully automated in 1986.

See also 

 List of lighthouses in New Zealand

References

External links 
 
 
 Lighthouses of New Zealand Maritime New Zealand

Lighthouses completed in 1865
Lighthouses completed in 1881
Lighthouses in New Zealand
South Taranaki District
Transport buildings and structures in Taranaki
1860s architecture in New Zealand
1865 establishments in New Zealand